Cedar Cove Feline Conservatory & Sanctuary is a small sanctuary located in Louisburg, Kansas, United States. It houses several felines, such as Siberian and Bengal tigers, lions, servals, a caracal, mountain lions, a leopard, and bobcats, as well as coatis and wolves.

External links

Buildings and structures in Miami County, Kansas
Wildlife sanctuaries of the United States
Tourist attractions in Miami County, Kansas